Kensington Park is a census-designated place (CDP) in Sarasota County, Florida, United States. The population was 3,901 at the 2010 census. It is part of the Bradenton–Sarasota–Venice Metropolitan Statistical Area.

History 
During the post-World War II economic boom a number of new subdivisions would spring up in the area surrounding Sarasota. In 1955,  the Paver Construction Company, would buy over 400 acres from Charles Schmid who had a dairy farm on that land.  Previously, the company had built the Paver Park Estates subdivision. Paver Construction was started when Martin Paver who was from New York state along with his wife had visited Sarasota in 1949 and liked it so much that he decided to move there and get into real estate development asking his two sons to get involved. Construction would begin in 1956 and had 1,400 homes in it when it was fully completed. The name of the subdivision comes from where the Pavers had lived at in Great Neck, New York.

It would be unique being the first sustainable community to ever be built in Southwestern Florida. Another fact that would make the subdivision unique was how the utilities would work. The utilities would be in the hands of the subdivision but each person who owned property would have a share of ownership in it. Purchasing a home would help pay for its installation and maintenance.

Geography
Kensington Park is located at  (27.356856, -82.495377).

Demographics

As of the census of 2000, there were 3,720 people, 1,567 households, and 1,024 families residing in the CDP. The racial makeup of the CDP was 96.24% White, 5.77% African American, 0.15% Native American, 1.30% Asian, 0.05% Pacific Islander, 3.87% from other races, and 1.51% from two or more races. Hispanic or Latino of any race were 1.54% of the population.

There were 1,567 households, out of which 25.4% had children under the age of 18 living with them, 50.5% were married couples living together, 11.0% had a female householder with no husband present, and 34.6% were non-families. 27.2% of all households were made up of individuals, and 15.3% had someone living alone who was 65 years of age or older.  The average household size was 2.37 and the average family size was 2.88.

In the CDP, the population was spread out, with 21.6% under the age of 18, 5.2% from 18 to 24, 28.6% from 25 to 44, 22.2% from 45 to 64, and 22.4% who were 65 years of age or older.  The median age was 41 years. For every 100 females, there were 90.6 males.  For every 100 females age 18 and over, there were 86.9 males.

The median income for a household in the CDP was $41,090, and the median income for a family was $48,981. Males had a median income of $29,235 versus $27,950 for females. The per capita income for the CDP was $21,990.  About 6.2% of families and 10.0% of the population were below the poverty line, including 14.9% of those under age 18 and 7.2% of those age 65 or over.

In 2010 Kensington Park had a population of 3,901.  The racial and ethnic makeup of the population was 92.6% white, 7.1% African American, 0.5% Native American, 1.7% Asian, 5.4% some other race, and 2.7% from two or more races. Hispanic or Latino persons of any race made up 1.4% of the population.

References

External links
Kensington Park Civic Association

Census-designated places in Sarasota County, Florida
Sarasota metropolitan area
Census-designated places in Florida